Mount Adams is a high mountain summit of the Crestones in the Sangre de Cristo Range of the Rocky Mountains of North America.

Climbing
Mount Adams can be climbed using Class 3 routes via the west ridge (Willow Lake), via the southeast face (Horn Creek Trailhead), or via the north west ridge (North Crestone Lake Trailhead).

See also

List of Colorado mountain ranges
List of Colorado mountain summits
List of Colorado fourteeners
List of Colorado 4000 meter prominent summits
List of the most prominent summits of Colorado
List of Colorado county high points

References

External links

SummitPost.org, Mount Adams

Mountains of Colorado
Mountains of Custer County, Colorado
Mountains of Saguache County, Colorado
North American 4000 m summits
Sangre de Cristo Mountains